Zavosse (Belarusian: Завоссе, Завосьсе; Russian: Заосье ; Polish: Zaosie) is a village in Belarus, in the Baranavichy Raion of Brest Region.

The village was the site of the farm and manor house belonging to the Mickiewicz family, probably the birthplace in 1798 of Adam Mickiewicz, when (following the Third Partition of Polish–Lithuanian Commonwealth  in 1795) the area lay within the Russian Empire.

In 1806 the lands passed to the Stypułkowski family, and in 1831 were confiscated by the imperial government as punishment for Lucjan Stypułkowski's participation in the November Uprising. Between 1918 and 1939 the village was in the Second Polish Republic, and in 1927 a monument to Mickiewicz was placed there. The manor and its surroundings were reconstructed in 1996.

Notable residents
 Adam Mickiewicz (1798-1855), Polish nationalist, national poet, essayist, translator, publicist, political theorist, and member of the Three Bards

References

Villages in Belarus